This page shows the results of the Cycling Competition at the 1983 Pan American Games, held from August 14 to August 29, 1983 in Caracas, Venezuela. There were a total number of seven events, with only men competing. The Points Race was added to the program.

Men's competition

Men's 1.000m Match Sprint (Track)

Men's 1.000m Time Trial (Track)

Men's 50 km Points Race (Track)

Men's 4.000m Individual Pursuit (Track)

Men's 4.000m Team Pursuit (Track)

Men's Individual Race (Road)

Men's Team Time Trial (Road)

Medal table

References
Results

Pan American
1983 in road cycling
1983
Events at the 1983 Pan American Games
1983 in track cycling
International cycle races hosted by Venezuela